She Married a Cop is a 1939 American comedy film directed by Sidney Salkow and written by Olive Cooper. The film stars Phil Regan, Jean Parker, Jerome Cowan, Dorothea Kent, Benny Baker and Barnett Parker. The film was released on July 12, 1939, by Republic Pictures.

Plot
A couple of cops, Jimmy Duffy and partner Joe, answer a call after a neighbor complains about the noise from an apartment where Hollywood studio animators Linda Fay and Bob Adams are auditioning actors for a cartoon pig.

After buying tickets to a policemen's ball and promising to keep the noise down, Linda overhears Jimmy singing a few notes and has an inspiration, hiring him. She neglects to tell him what for, however, and Jimmy believes he will be seen singing in a movie.

They fall in love and marry, but Jimmy is humiliated at the film's premiere, with all his family and friends there, when his voice comes from "Paddy," the cartoon pig. It leads to a separation, but Jimmy has a change of heart when he finds out that Linda is expecting a baby, which will also be used in the story of Paddy's next cartoon.

Cast
Phil Regan as Jimmy Duffy
Jean Parker as Linda Fay
Jerome Cowan as Bob Adams
Dorothea Kent as Mabel Dunne
Benny Baker as Sidney
Barnett Parker as Bekins
Horace McMahon as Joe Nash
Oscar O'Shea as Pa Duffy
Mary Gordon as Ma Duffy
Muriel Campbell as Minnie
Peggy Ryan as Trudy
Richard Keene as Pete

Awards and nominations

References

External links
 

1939 films
1930s English-language films
American comedy films
1939 comedy films
Republic Pictures films
Films directed by Sidney Salkow
Films produced by Sol C. Siegel
Films scored by William Lava
American black-and-white films
1930s American films